The Waccamaw were a Native American tribe of South Carolina.

Waccamaw may also refer to:

Waccamaw Siouan Indians, a Native American Tribe of North Carolina
Waccamaw Corp., a former home furnishings retailer
Waccamaw River, which drains the lake
Lake Waccamaw, a lake in North Carolina
, a United States Navy vessel